Cartrema americana, commonly called American olive, wild olive, or devilwood, is an evergreen shrub or small tree native to southeastern North America, in the United States from Virginia to Texas, and in Mexico from Nuevo León south to Oaxaca and Veracruz.

Cartrema americana was formerly classified as Osmanthus americanus. Following the discovery that Osmanthus was polyphyletic, it was transferred to the segregate genus Cartrema together with Osmanthus floridanus and five Asian species.

Its flowers, produced in early spring, are small (1 cm long), white, with a four-lobed corolla and have a strong fragrance. The fruit is a globose dark blue drupe  diameter, containing a single seed.

It is cultivated as an ornamental plant in gardens for its fragrant flowers.

References

Oleeae
Flora of North America
Plants described in 1767